Political Christianity may refer to:

Christianity
Christianity and politics
Christian right